Tom Barker (born 1966) is a British designer and academic. He has held various appointments, including the Ontario College of Art and Design, Canada, the University of Technology, Sydney, Australia, and the Royal College of Art, London.

Barker invented SmartSlab, a multimedia large scale digital LED display panel system, in 1999, whilst working on a Millennium Dome zone with architect Zaha Hadid.  Barker also developed  the V/SpaceLAB virtual reality system for architecture which artists Langlands and Bell used for an exhibit at the Imperial War Museum in 2003.

From 1997 to 2005, Barker ran DCA-b (later called b Consultants Ltd.), a multidisciplinary design practice.

Book
 Weird Scenes from Inside the Goldmine: Innovating with Futuristic Technology and Amazing Materials in Design.  Shoreditch: Black Dog Publishing, 2008.  .

References

British designers
British industrial designers
21st-century British inventors
Living people
1966 births
People educated at King's College School, London
Alumni of the Royal College of Art
Alumni of the University of Edinburgh
Alumni of the University of Cambridge